Celita Valerie Schutz (born 17 February 1968 in Houston, Texas) is an American judoka who competed in the 1996 Summer Olympics, in the 2000 Summer Olympics, and in the 2004 Summer Olympics on the women's team. She is a graduate of Yale University. class of 1990.

Schutz grew up in River Vale, New Jersey, where seeing her brother taking a lesson convinced her to take up judo at the age of six. She began training at a young age with Sensei Ogasawara at Kokushi Dojo, in Westwood, New Jersey. She became nationally ranked at age 14 and internationally ranked at age 16. While competing worldwide, much of Celita's extended international training occurred in Japan, Spain, Germany and Brazil. She became Captain of the 1996 US Olympic Women's Judo Team; held consecutive #1 ranking in the United States for seven years; and while accumulating medals from around the world, achieved highest ranking of 5th in the World with expert coaching of Sensei Matsumura, Technical Advisor of Kokushikai, Inc.

Schutz has been a resident of Hillsdale, New Jersey, and currently runs the Kokushikai Judo Academy in Fair Lawn, New Jersey, and is the president of the United States Judo Association.

Selected accomplishments
1996 Summer Olympics, Atlanta
2000 Summer Olympics, Sydney
2004 Summer Olympics, Athens
2x World Team Member
US Open International Champion
Multi-time International Medalist
6x US National Judo Champion (Senior Level)
2x US Olympic Committee Female Athlete of the Year, Judo
Ultimate Female Titan
2x Grapplers Quest BJJ Champion
ADCC North American Champion, 2007
Certified Personal Trainer, NASM

References

1968 births
Living people
American female judoka
Olympic judoka of the United States
Judoka at the 1996 Summer Olympics
Judoka at the 2000 Summer Olympics
Judoka at the 2004 Summer Olympics
People from Hillsdale, New Jersey
People from Houston
People from River Vale, New Jersey
Pan American Games medalists in judo
Sportspeople from Bergen County, New Jersey
Pan American Games silver medalists for the United States
Judoka at the 1999 Pan American Games
Medalists at the 1999 Pan American Games
21st-century American women